The American black swift, or more simply black swift (Cypseloides niger), is a species of bird that is found from northern British Columbia in Canada through the United States and Mexico to Costa Rica and Brazil. They are also found in the Caribbean.

Taxonomy
The American black swift was formally described in 1789 by the German naturalist Johann Friedrich Gmelin in his revised and expanded edition of Carl Linnaeus's Systema Naturae. He placed it with all the other swallows and swifts in the genus Hirundo and coined the binomial name Hirundo nigra. Gmelin based his description on that of French zoologist Mathurin Jacques Brisson who, in 1760, had described and illustrated "Le Martinet de Saint Dominigue" from a preserved specimen. The type locality is Hispaniola: Saint-Domingue was a French colony on the Caribbean island. The American black swift is now placed with seven other swifts in the genus Cypseloides that was introduced in 1848 by the German naturist August Vollrath Streubel. The genus name combines the genus Cypselus introduced by Johann Illiger in 1811 and the Ancient Greek -oidēs meaning "resembling". The specific epithet niger is the Latin word for "black".

Three subspecies are recognised:
 C. n. borealis (Kennerly, 1858) – southeast Alaska to southwest USA
 C. n. costaricensis Ridgway, 1910 – central Mexico to Costa Rica
 C. n. niger (Gmelin, JF, 1789) – West Indies and Trinidad

Description
In flight, these birds resemble a flying cigar with long slender curved wings. The plumage is mostly a sooty, dark gray. There is some contrast between the inner and outer portions of the wing. The shoulders are distinctly darker in color than other parts of the wing. They have short tails that are slightly forked.

Distribution and habitat
Fewer than 150 black swift breeding sites are known in the United States, with 108 (as of July 2012) known from Colorado. These include:
 In Alberta: next to waterfall in Johnston Canyon, Banff National Park (declining, given extra protection as of August 2018)
 In California: the Santa Cruz coast (where it is declining); Berry Creek Falls; Burney Falls State Park; Yosemite, Sequoia, and Kings Canyon National Parks; the San Bernardino Mountains; and the San Jacinto Mountains
 In Colorado: Box Canyon near Ouray, Hanging Lake, Hawk Creek Falls, Falls Creek Falls, and Niagara and Cataract Gulches
 In New Mexico: Jemez Falls
 In Utah: Stewart Falls
 In Washington: Semiahmoo Bay

These birds migrate out of North America after the breeding season. It remains unclear where most of the birds spend the winter, although some of the birds have been tracked as far south as Brazil. A study published in 2012 tagged four birds breeding in Colorado with a light level geolocator and found that the birds wintered in the lowland rainforest of western Brazil. Some of the birds in the West Indies appear to be permanent residents. They are late spring migrants into the breeding range, with Colorado breeders not arriving until the very end of May into June. Large flocks of migrants are occasionally seen spring and fall, but only very rarely far south of the U.S. breeding range.

Behavior and ecology

Food and feeding
American black swifts live on the wing, foraging in flight. They eat flying insects, primarily flying ants and beetles, often foraging in small groups.

Breeding
Their breeding habitat is frequently associated with water. The birds most often nest on high cliff faces, either above the ocean surf or behind or next to waterfalls. The nest is made of twigs and moss glued together with mud. They will also use ferns and seaweed if available. The clutch size is one egg, with incubation lasting 23–27 days. Newly hatched young are probably fed multiple times a day, but older nestlings usually only once a day by each parent, most often at dusk. Adults spend the night roosting at or near the nest site.

References

External links

 Black swift Stamps from the Lesser Antilles: Dominica at bird-stamps.org
 
 
 
 
 

American black swift
Native birds of Western Canada
Native birds of the Western United States
Birds of Central America
Birds of Hispaniola
Birds of the Dominican Republic
Birds of Haiti
American black swift
American black swift